Sandgate Cemetery is a necropolis in the Hunter region near Newcastle, New South Wales, Australia, and has been continuously operating since 1881. The cemetery caters for all religious, ethnic and cultural requirements.

History 
Sandgate Cemetery was opened in 1881 and has serviced the burial needs of Newcastle since that time.  It is situated on Crown Land within the suburb of Sandgate, New South Wales. The cemetery is managed by a not for profit community organisation, Northern Cemeteries, through a Board of Trustees.

To service the new cemetery, a special Mortuary Station was built in Newcastle. Special trams conveyed funerals from the suburbs to the Mortuary Station then onward to a purpose built platform within the cemetery.  Modern upgrades and changes continue to be made to this working cemetery.

Notable interments 
The cemetery  has over 85,000 interments. Notably among these include: 
 William Brennan, politician
 Stanley Carpenter DCM, footballer and soldier
 Matthew Charlton, Leader of the Federal Opposition   
 Hugh Connell, soldier and politician
 Peter Connolly, politician   
 Charles Crombie DSO, WWII pilot  
 Alfred Goninan, founder of A Goninan & Co  
 Frank Hawkins, politician   
 Herb Narvo, footballer & boxer
 Frank Purdue, politician  
 John Christian Reid, Mayor of Newcastle
 Dave Sands (David Ritchie), Aboriginal Australian boxer  
 Arthur Selwyn, 1st Dean of Newcastle  
 James Smith, politician
 Jack Stretch, Anglican Bishop of Newcastle
 Pat Walsh, rugby league and rugby union footballer  
 David Watkins Snr, politician

Gallery

References

1881 establishments in Australia
Anglican cemeteries in Australia
Cemeteries in New South Wales
Eastern Orthodox cemeteries
Roman Catholic cemeteries in Australia